State Highway 28 (SH 28) is a State Highway in Kerala, India that starts at Valluvambram near Malappuram and ends at the state boundary. The highway is 65 km long.

The Route Map 
Valluvambram - Manjeri - Edavanna - Nilambur-
- Edakkara - Vazhikadavu - State boundary

See also 
Roads in Kerala
List of State Highways in Kerala

References 

State Highways in Kerala
Roads in Kozhikode district
Roads in Malappuram district